Samir Enrique Arzú García (born 19 March 1981) is a Honduran footballer who plays as a midfielder for Motagua New Orleans.

Career

Club
Arzú got his career underway in Honduras with Real España, which preceded a move to fellow Honduran clubs Hispano, Real Juventud, Atlético Olanchano and Olimpia between 2006 and 2009; he featured twice for Olimpia during the 2008–09 CONCACAF Champions League. In 2009, Arzú completed a move to Correcaminos UAT of Liga de Ascenso. He made his professional debut against León on 31 July, which was the first of nine appearances in Mexico's second tier. Arzú sealed a return to Real Juventud in 2010, before signing for Victoria a year later - he scored three goals for each club in a season.

China League One side Shanghai Tellace loaned Arzú for the 2012 campaign. The club won the title and promotion in his sole season in China. After returning to Victoria for the first part of 2013, he found himself on the move again later in the year after agreeing to play for Suchitepéquez of the Liga Nacional de Fútbol de Guatemala. He netted on his debut, scoring the third goal of a 4–1 home win over Xelajú on 4 August 2013. Arzú had subsequent spells with Vida, Barillas and Deportivo Jocotán, prior to a short return to Victoria in 2016. Arzú joined USA's Gulf Coast Premier League team Motagua New Orleans in 2016.

International
Arzú represented the Honduras U23s in the 2004 CONCACAF Men's Pre-Olympic Tournament, as his nation narrowly missed out on the 2004 Summer Olympics in Greece after placing third.

Career statistics
.

Honours
Shanghai Tellace
China League One: 2012

Motagua New Orleans
Gulf Coast Premier League (2): 2015–16, 2016–17

References

External links

1981 births
Living people
People from Jutiapa Department
Honduran footballers
Association football midfielders
Honduran expatriate footballers
Expatriate footballers in Mexico
Expatriate footballers in China
Expatriate footballers in Guatemala
Expatriate soccer players in the United States
Honduran expatriate sportspeople in Mexico
Honduran expatriate sportspeople in China
Honduran expatriate sportspeople in Guatemala
Honduran expatriate sportspeople in the United States
Ascenso MX players
Liga Nacional de Fútbol Profesional de Honduras players
Liga Nacional de Fútbol de Guatemala players
Gulf Coast Premier League players
Real C.D. España players
Hispano players
C.D. Real Juventud players
Atlético Olanchano players
C.D. Olimpia players
Correcaminos UAT footballers
C.D. Victoria players
Shanghai Port F.C. players
C.D. Suchitepéquez players
Barillas FC players
Motagua New Orleans players